Knowle is a small village in Shropshire, England. It lies largely in the civil parish of Nash.

The football club "Clee Hill United" play their home games at Knowle Sports Ground, the highest venue in the Mercian Regional Football League at an elevation of 935–950 feet (285-290m).

References

External links

Villages in Shropshire